Jaya Misra is an Indian writer, creative director and producer in television, films, web series and documentaries. 

Misra is a prominent Indian television and OTT writer, having worked on series including VOOT's most successful series It's Not that Simple (2016), and the hit web-series Kehne Ko Humsafar Hain and Coldd Lassi Aur Chicken Masala. She is also known for authoring Kama: The Story of the Kama Sutra (2018).

Career

Film 
Misra worked on various documentaries for Business Television India (BITV), including Hai Akhtari, Remembering Beghum Akhtar, Uttaradhikar, a glimpse of the Uttarakhand movement through the eyes of hill women, and a series of three documentaries on sex workers in India, Najayaz, AIDS lies & Documentaries and Tawaif.

Misra also wrote and directed several segments for ICC Champions trophy 2002 and ICC cricket world cup 2003 Sony Entertainment Television, additionally working on capsules and pieces for various news channels, wrote for events like Lakmé Fashion Week and Miss India Pageant. She also wrote the Hindi dubbed version of Mickey Mouse Clubhouse on Disney Junior.

Misra directed the documentary Surfing Yogis in 2014.

She acted as a Senior Creative Director for the Star Plus television show, Ishq Kills (2014) 

In 2015, Misra wrote the drama series Dosti... Yariyaan... Manmarziyan. Exploring the lives of two women from contrasting backgrounds, Manmarziyan enjoyed critical success. The Times of India stated that "Manmarziyan has created characters which are real and relatable to the youth today." However, it failed to garner audiences' ratings and it was cancelled in just under five months.

Misra next worked on Season 2 of the Voot Original It's Not That Simple, which became VOOT's most popular series at the time. It's Not That Simple was met with a generally positive reception for its depiction of gender biases and messages of empowerment.

This was followed by another VOOT production, Time Out, which she co-wrote alongside Danish Aslam.

In 2018, Misra wrote the ZEE5 web series Kehne Ko Humsafar Hain, created by Ekta Kapoor. It received widespread acclaim for its complex and mature narrative, and was generally very well received. Misra would return to the series for the second and third season, which were also well received.

Misra is a frequent collaborator of Kapoor's, having worked on Coldd Lassi Aur Chicken Masala, Bebakee and the upcoming A Married Woman' The series went on to be nominated at the Filmfare OTT Awards 2020'. Books 
Influenced by the works of Anais Nin, Erica Jong, and Virginia Woolf, Misra takes a keen interest in issues pertaining to women's rights. Misra's debut novel, Kama: The Story of the Kama Sutra, was published by OM Books in May 2018. It received positive critical reviews which focused on the extensive world-building, and Misra's unique style of writing. Kama: The Story of the Kama Sutra'' is a fictionalised biography of Vātsyāyana.

A contemporary novel depicting the life and times of the Indian logician who lived 2000 years ago, and compiled ancient erotic texts with his witty aphorisms to create the Kama Sutra. Set in 273 A.D, in a land fraught with war and unrest, Kama is the story of a catastrophic day in a writer-artist's life that sets him off on a journey unto himself, beyond the boundaries of love, family and betrayal. This fast-paced story of tragedy and triumph beguiles and captivates as it flits between an agonising past, an erotic present and a cataclysmic future. The book marked Jaya Misra's debut as an author.

In 2019, Misra was invited to speak at TEDxMITID. Misra's talk focused around her journey in finding herself and her passion within literature.

Filmography

References

External links 
 

Year of birth missing (living people)
Living people